The 2009–10 season was Fulham's 112th professional season and their ninth consecutive season in the top flight of English football, the Premier League, since their return in 2001. They also competed in European competition for the second time in their history, in the newly formed UEFA Europa League after finishing in the seventh position in the 2008–09 season. After beginning in the qualifying rounds of the competition, Fulham eventually reached the final, where they lost 2–1 to Atlético Madrid after extra-time.

The fixtures for the Premier League season were announced on 17 June, with Fulham beginning the season against Portsmouth at Fratton Park on the weekend of 15 August. They entered the Football League Cup at the third round stage due to their participation in European competition. They also reached the quarter-finals of the FA Cup, where they were defeated by Tottenham Hotspur.

Pre-season and friendlies
Fulham announced the first three fixtures of their 2009 pre-season schedule on 4 May 2009, with the team scheduled to tour Australia soon after the end of the squad's summer break. The team first played Gold Coast United at Skilled Park in Robina on Wednesday, 8 July. Next, the squad travelled to Melbourne to face Melbourne Victory at Etihad (Docklands) Stadium on Saturday, 11 July. The trip concluded with a match against Perth Glory at Members Equity Stadium (Perth Oval) on Wednesday, 15 July.

Upon their return to England, they played a friendly against AFC Bournemouth on 21 July and Peterborough United on 25 July. Further fixtures were added for the Development Squad against local semi-professional sides AFC Wimbledon, Woking, Aldershot, Staines and Walton Casuals. The team were also involved in a third round qualifying match for the UEFA Europa League. The draw was made on 17 July, giving Fulham a match against Lithuanian side FK Vėtra or Finnish club HJK Helsinki. Vėtra were confirmed as Fulham's opponents after winning the tie 3–2 on aggregate.

Their pre-season campaign started with defeat to Gold Coast United. Despite Danny Murphy scoring in the 15th minute, Gold Coast scored twice in the final ten minutes to win the match. This was followed by a 3–0 victory against Melbourne Glory and a 5–0 win against Perth Glory. Andy Johnson scored in both games and Erik Nevland scored a hat-trick against Perth to follow up a goal in Melbourne. Eddie Johnson and Andranik Teymourian were the other two scorers in the matches in Melbourne and Perth respectively.

Fulham's first match back in England was a 0–0 draw against AFC Bournemouth on 21 July at Dean Court. This was followed four days later by their final pre-season friendly, an eventful match at London Road against Peterborough United. Clint Dempsey and Bobby Zamora (2) gave Fulham a 3–0 half-time lead, but Aaron McLean and George Boyd (2) scored second-half goals to salvage a 3–3 draw.

Premier League

Fulham began their Premier League season with an away match at Fratton Park against Portsmouth. Their opponents were in financial trouble and had sold many of their top players, including Peter Crouch and Glen Johnson during the summer. A minute's applause was held before the game in memory of Fulham's former manager Sir Bobby Robson. In a game that Fulham controlled, Bobby Zamora put the away side in the lead after 13 minutes, deflecting a Clint Dempsey shot past Portsmouth goalkeeper David James. Both sides created chances but Fulham held the greater threat and won the match 1–0.

Fulham's second league match of the season was against near-neighbours Chelsea in the West London derby. Fulham were missing the injured Andy Johnson and new signing Damien Duff came into the side to replace him, with Dempsey playing alongside Zamora. Dempsey and Chelsea's Didier Drogba both had opportunities but, in the hot conditions, neither side had many shots in the first half. Drogba, however, gave Chelsea the lead five minutes before the break, shooting low past Schwarzer. Nicolas Anelka, the provider for Drogba's goal, doubled their lead from Drogba's throughball in the 76th minute, effectively sealing the match 2–0 in Chelsea's favour.

The third fixture of the season was an away match at Villa Park against Aston Villa. New midfield signing Jonathan Greening made his debut and Aaron Hughes captained the side in the absence of Murphy. Fulham got off to the worst possible start when John Paintsil, under pressure from Villa's Carlos Cuéllar, inadvertently headed the ball past Schwarzer. Villa had a few promising attacks, notably through the pace of striker Gabriel Agbonlahor, but Fulham created chances of their own in an even first half. However they could not score past goalkeeper Brad Friedel and were punished by a second goal, this time from their own player Agbonlahor on the hour mark. Villa held out for a 2–0 victory and Fulham lost their second successive Premier League match.

Results summary

Results by round

FA Cup

Football League Cup
In the third round draw, Fulham were drawn against fellow Premier League side Manchester City, who had spent £120 million on new players during the summer.

UEFA Europa League 

Fulham began their first European campaign in seven years with a third qualifying round tie against FK Vėtra from Lithuania. The first leg was played away at the Vėtra Stadium on 30 July 2009. Hodgson started with his preferred line-up from the previous season, with Brede Hangeland, Aaron Hughes, John Pantsil and Paul Konchesky in front of Schwarzer and the front pairing of Andy Johnson and Bobby Zamora. Dickson Etuhu was the only absentee, giving an opportunity to Chris Baird in central midfield. The game was tight for the first half-hour before Fulham seized the initiative and Bobby Zamora gave them the lead on the stroke of half-time with a shot just inside the penalty area. Danny Murphy doubled Fulham's advantage from the penalty spot in the 56th minute following a foul on Zamora. Both sides made changes but Fulham continued to press and they added a third goal through Seol Ki-hyeon five minutes from the end. A minute's silence was held before the second match at Craven Cottage following the death of former Fulham manager Sir Bobby Robson. Fulham took the lead in the 57th minute through Etuhu, putting the tie beyond any real doubt at 4–0. Andy Johnson scored two further goals from close range in the 80th and 84th minutes, the latter set up by his namesake Eddie Johnson. Fulham progressed to the next round and awaited the identity of their opponents for the play-offs.

The draw for the play-off round was conducted on 7 August and saw Fulham drawn against the unfamiliar opposition of Amkar Perm from Russia. In the first leg at Craven Cottage, Andy Johnson scored early on in the 4th minute to settle any nerves but he also picked up an injury to his collarbone in the first half and had to be substituted. Clint Dempsey scored a second goal just after half-time and Zamora added to the lead in the 75th minute. Amkar Perm did manage to score an away-goal two minutes later in the shape of a Martin Kushev volley but Fulham held a 3–1 advantage. Fulham travelled to Russia for the second leg without the presence of injured first-team regulars Andy Johnson, Murphy, Zamora and Konchesky. Amkar Perm dominated the match but did not score a goal until the last minute when Martin Kushev scored a header past Schwarzer. Fulham's 3–1 victory from the first leg, however, was enough to see them through 3–2 on aggregate.

The draw for the group stages was made a day later. Fulham were drawn in Group E along with Roma of Italy, Swiss side Basel and Bulgaria's CSKA Sofia.

Group stage

Statistics

Appearances and goals
Last updated on 9 May 2010.
The squad numbers were announced at the beginning of the 2009–10 season. Chris Baird was given the number 6 shirt, which Andranik Teymourian wore during the 2008–09 season – Teymourian was given the number 14 shirt instead. Seol Ki-hyeon managed to get back the number 7 after Giles Barnes returned to Derby County after having been at Fulham on loan. Bobby Zamora was given the number 25 shirt, pushing Simon Davies to number 29. The players with higher squad numbers changed squad numbers to fill the list. Before Joe Anderson left the club and made his debut, he was given the number 36 shirt.

|-
|colspan="10"|Players who are no longer playing for Fulham or who have been loaned out in the January transfer window:

|}

Top scorers
Includes all competitive matches. The list is sorted by shirt number when total goals are equal.

Last updated on 9 May 2010

† = Player is no longer with the club but still scored a goal during the season.

Disciplinary record
Includes all competitive matches. Players with 1 card or more included only.

Last updated on 25 October 2009

Transfers

There was transfer speculation surrounding the futures of Brede Hangeland and Bobby Zamora, with the former wanted by several clubs including Arsenal and the latter by Hull City, however both remained at Fulham. Goalkeeper Mark Schwarzer was in talks about a new contract at the club. Danny Murphy signed a new contract during pre-season to keep him at the club until 2011.

In
Roy Hodgson made his first signing of the summer on 16 June when he brought in Stephen Kelly from Birmingham City on a free transfer. Bjørn Helge Riise, the brother of former Liverpool player John Arne Riise, became Fulham's second signing of the summer when he moved from Lillestrøm SK. Damien Duff was Fulham's third summer signing when he joined from Newcastle United for an undisclosed fee. Midfielder Jonathan Greening signed from West Bromwich Albion and he was joined by another midfielder, South African Kagisho Dikgacoi from Golden Arrows. Swedish international striker David Elm was the final transfer of the summer, signing on deadline day from Kalmar FF.

Out
Seven players left the club on 2 July: Karim Laribi, Collins John, Moritz Volz and Julian Gray were released; Giles Barnes and Olivier Dacourt departed at the end of their loan spells; Leon Andreasen made a permanent move to Hannover 96. Hameur Bouazza and Adrian Leijer were both released by the club; Bouazza moved to Turkish club Sivasspor while Leijer went to Melbourne Victory for an undisclosed fee.

Loan Out

Notes

2010 Europa League Final Lineup

|valign="top"|

References
General

Specific

External links
Fulham F.C. official website
Fulham – UEFA Europa League – UEFA.COM
2009–10 Fulham F.C. season at ESPN

2009–10 Premier League by team
2009–10